Radu Malfatti is an Austrian trombone and harmonica player, and composer. He was born in Innsbruck, in the province of Tyrol, on December 16, 1943. Malfatti is associated with the style of music known as reductionism  and has been described as "among the leaders in redefining the avant-garde as truly on-the-edge art." His work "since the early nineties... has been investigating the edges of ultraminimalism in both his composed and improvised work." He also operates B-Boim, a CD-R-only record label focusing on improvised and composed music, much of it his own.

Discography

As leader
 Balance with Balance (Incus, 1973)
 Thrumblin with Stephan Wittwer (FMP, 1976)
 Und? with Stephan Wittwer (FMP, 1978)
 Bracknell Breakdown with Harry Miller (Ogun, 1978)
 Humanimal with Jerry Chardonnens (Hat Hut, 1980)
 Blek with M.L.A. Blek (FMP, 1981)
 Ach Was!? with Ulrich Gumpert, Tony Oxley (FMP, 1981)
 Zwecknagel with Harry Miller (FMP, 1981)
 Formu (Nato, 1983)
 Ohrkiste (ITM, 1992)
 Radu Malfatti (Wandelweiser, 1997)
 Dach with Durrant/Lehn (Erstwhile, 2001)
 Going Fragile (Formed, 2006)
 Zeitschatten (B-Boim, 2007)
 Das Pelzige M (B-Boim, 2007)
 Three Backgrounds with Frey/Pisaro (B-Boim, 2007)
 Hoffinger Nonett (B-Boim, 2007)
 Nonostante II (B-Boim, 2007)
 Hoffingerquartett (B-Boim, 2007)
 Friedrichshofquartett (B-Boim, 2007)
 Dusseldorf Oktett (B-Boim, 2007)
 Raum Zeit I (B-Boim, 2007)
 Kid Ailack 5 (B-Boim, 2008)
 Dusseldorf Vielfaches (B-Boim, 2008)
 Claude Lorrain 1 (B-Boim, 2008)
 Imaoto with Klaus Filip (Erstwhile, 2009)
 Goat Vs Donkey with Taku Unami (Taumaturgia, 2009)
 Himmelgeister 19 (B-Boim, 2010)
 Cafe Oto 1 (B-Boim, 2010)
 Darenootodesuka (B-Boim, 2012)
 Untitled with Taku Unami (Erstwhile, 2012)
 Ruten (B-Boim, 2014)
 II with Jurg Frey (Erstwhile, 2014)
 One Man and a Fly (Cathnor, 2015)

As sideman
With Elton Dean
 Happy Daze (Ogun, 1977)
 Live at the BBC (Hux, 2003)
 Ninesense Suite (Jazzwerkstatt 2011)
 The 100 Club Concert 1979 (Reel 2012)

With Barry Guy & London Jazz Composers' Orchestra
 Zurich Concerts (Intakt, 1988)
 Harmos (Intakt, 1989)
 Double Trouble (Intakt, 1990)
 Theoria (Intakt, 1992)
 Portraits (Intakt, 1994)
 Study II & Stringer (Intakt, 2005)

With Chris McGregor
 Live at Willisau (Ogun, 1974)
 Procession (Ogun, 1978)
 Yes Please (In and Out 1981)
 Bremen to Bridgwater (Cuneiform, 2004)

With Burkhard Stangl
 Ereignislose Musik Loose Music (Random Acoustics, 1996)
 Venusmond Oper Als Topos (Quell, 2000)
 Hommage a Moi (Loewenhertz 2011)

With others
 Antoine Beuger, Cantor Quartets (Another Timbre 2013)
 Andrea Centazzo, Doctor Faustus (Ictus, 2006)
 Malcolm Goldstein, A Sounding of Sources (New World, 2008)
 Sven-Ake Johansson, Sven-Ake Johansson Mit Dem NMUI Im SO 36 '79 (FMP, 1987)
 Franz Koglmann, The Use of Memory (hat ART, 1991)
 Steve Lacy, Itinerary (hat ART, 1991)
 Joe McPhee, Topology (Hat Hut 1981)
 Joe McPhee, The Loneliest Woman (Corbett vs Dempsey 2012)
 Louis Moholo, Spirits Rejoice! (Ogun, 1978)
 Louis Moholo, Bra Louis Bra Tebs & Spirits Rejoice! (Ogun, 2006)
 Michael Pisaro, Nature Denatured and Found Again (Gravity Wave 2019)
 Polwechsel, Polwechsel (Random Acoustics, 1995)
 Soft Heap, Soft Heap (Charly, 1979)
 Taku Sugimoto, Quartet & Octet Slubmusic (Tengu, 2014)
 Gary Windo, His Master's Bones (Cuneiform, 1996)

References

External links
 
 Interview with Radu Malfatti

1943 births
Living people
Musicians from Innsbruck
Austrian male composers
Austrian composers
Free improvisation
The Dedication Orchestra members
Composers from Innsbruck